Team Dukla Praha is a Czech cycling team founded in 2003. It participates in UCI Continental Circuits races. In 2019, the team downgraded to club status.

Doping
On 18 September 2015, the Czech Cycling Federation announced that 22 year old track cyclist Ondřej Rybín (Czech Republic) had been handed a 4-year ban from sports after he'd tested positive for EPO in an out-of-competition control in June. Rybin had won bronze in the scratch race at the 2015 European Track Championships (under-23 & junior) in July, a race he was set to be disqualified from after the positive from June was revealed.

2016 Roster

Major wins

2011
Stage 1 Szlakiem Grodów Piastowskich, Jiří Hochmann
Stages 2 & 4 Tour of Taihu Lake, Alois Kaňkovský
2012
Stages 2 & 3 Azerbaijan International Cycling Tour, Alois Kaňkovský
Stage 6 Azerbaijan International Cycling Tour, Vojtěch Hačecký
 National Road Race championships, Milan Kadlec
Grand Prix Kralovehradeckeho kraje, Martin Hačecký
Overall Okolo Jižních Čech, Jiří Hochmann
Stage 1, Jiří Hochmann
Overall Tour of Taihu Lake, Milan Kadlec
Stage 1, Milan Kadlec
Stages 2 & 8, Alois Kaňkovský
Stage 1 Tour of Fuzhou, Alois Kaňkovský
Stage 3 Tour of Fuzhou, Milan Kadlec
2013
Stages 2, 3 & 4 Tour of Iran, Alois Kaňkovský
Stage 6 Tour of Iran, Milan Kadlec
Stages 1 & 3 Tour of China I, Alois Kaňkovský
Overall Tour of China II, Alois Kaňkovský
Stages 2, 3 & 4, Alois Kaňkovský
Stages 5 & 7 Tour of Taihu Lake, Alois Kaňkovský
Tour of Nanjing, Alois Kaňkovský
Stage 3 Tour of Fuzhou, Jiří Hochmann
2014
Stage 3 Tour of Iran, Milan Kadlec
Stage 2 Tour of Taihu Lake, Alois Kaňkovský
2015
Korona Kocich Gór, František Sisr

References

UCI Continental Teams (Europe)
Cycling teams based in the Czech Republic
Cycling teams established in 2011
Cycling
Sport in Prague